This is the progression of world record improvements of the triple jump W45 division of Masters athletics.

Key:

References

External links
Masters Athletics Triple Jump list

Masters athletics world record progressions
Triple jump